Aage Ki Soch  is 1988 Hindi language Drama movie directed by Dada Kondke, starring Shakti Kapoor, Swapna, Raza Murad and Satish Shah.

Cast
 Shakti Kapoor
 Swapna
 Raza Murad
 Satish Shah
 Dada Kondke
 Huma Khan
 Manorama Wagle

Soundtrack

External links

References

1988 films
1980s Hindi-language films
Films scored by Raamlaxman
Indian drama films